Wilhelm Lindenschmit (the Elder) (March 9, 1806 – March 12, 1848) was a German history painter born in Mainz. He was an older brother to prehistorian Ludwig Lindenschmit (1809–1893), and father to history painter Wilhelm Lindenschmit the Younger (1829–1895).

Lindenschmidt studied art in the academies at Munich and Vienna, returning to Munich in 1826 as an assistant to Peter von Cornelius (1783–1867). Here, he painted Sieg Ludwigs des Reichen über Albrecht Achilles von Brandenburg bei Giengen an der Brenz (Victory of Ludwig over Albrecht Achilles of Brandenburg at Giengen an der Brenz) in the arcades of the Hofgarten, as well as Leben des Leonardo da Vinci (Life of Leonardo da Vinci) on the loggia at Alte Pinakothek. Afterwards, he performed a series of frescos at the Castle of Hohenschwangau.
 
In 1830 he finished work on the fresco Die Bauernschlacht von Sendling 1705 (The Farmer's Battle of Sendling 1705) on the outer wall of the old parish church of St. Margaret in Sendling. Later in his career, he painted a series of frescos at the ducal castle of Lantlsberg in regards to the history of the House of Wettin.

He also painted in oils, several of which are presently located at galleries in Karlsruhe, Munich, Mainz and Leipzig. These works include Schlacht des Arminius (Battle of Arminius) and Einzug Ottos des Großen in das befreite Augsburg am Abend nach dem Sieg auf dem Lechfeld (Entry of Otto the Great into Augsburg after victory at Lechfeld). In 1848 he was commissioned as court painter at Meiningen, but died soon afterwards at the age of 42.

References
 This article is based on a translation of an equivalent article at the German Wikipedia, whose sources include:
 ADB: Lindenschmit, Wilhelm @ Allgemeine Deutsche Biographie.
 Lindenschmit, Wilhelm @ NDB/ADB Deutsche Biographie.
 The New International Encyclopaedia

19th-century German painters
19th-century German male artists
German male painters
1806 births
1848 deaths
Artists from Mainz
Court painters
Fresco painters